Zuzana Bergrová (born 24 November 1984, in Ústí nad Labem) is a sprinter and hurdler from Czech Republic.

Personal bests

Achievements

References

External links 
 

Czech female sprinters
Czech female hurdlers
Olympic athletes of the Czech Republic
Athletes (track and field) at the 2012 Summer Olympics
1984 births
Living people
European Athletics Championships medalists
Sportspeople from Ústí nad Labem
World Athletics Indoor Championships medalists